Lumiere is a Brazilian film production and distribution company that is based in Rio de Janeiro.

Founded in 1990, the company began as a distributor of independent and international titles for theatrical, home video, and television rights. From 1996 to 2003, Lumiere maintained an exclusive output deal with Miramax for the territory of Brazil. Titles released during this period include The English Patient, Chicago and the Scary Movie franchise.  By 2002, Lumiere was the market leading independent distributor in Brazil.

Lumiere premiered its operations as a motion picture producer in 1996 with Little Book of Love. Since then, Lumiere has also produced or co-produced films such as City of God, Madame Satã and Os Normais.

References

Variety article about Lumiere: http://www.variety.com/article/VR1117973948.html?categoryid=2523&cs=1

Film production companies of Brazil
Companies based in Rio de Janeiro (city)
Entertainment companies established in 1990
1990 establishments in Brazil